Mansour Bahrami and Mark Philippoussis won the title, defeating Jonas Björkman and Thomas Johansson in the final, 4–3(5–3), 4–2. The Men's Legends' Doubles was competed in the 2019 Australian Open in Melbourne Park. "Doubles tennis can be enjoyed by players of all levels and of all ages", from children beginning tennis lessons through to the level of the Australian Open.

Draw

Final

Laver group

Rosewall group

References

External links
 Men's Legends Doubles
 Men's Doubles
 Men's Legends Doubles Profiles

Men's Legends Doubles